The Texas Davis Mountains AVA  is an American Viticultural Area located in the Trans-Pecos region of West Texas. Surrounded by the Chihuahuan Desert, the appellation takes advantage of cooler elevation and lower annual rainfall in the Davis Mountains. The soil is primarily granitic, porphyritic, and volcanic in nature. The hardiness zones are 7b and 8a.

Wineries
Only one commercial winery has ever been operated in the Texas Davis Mountains AVA since its creation in 1998: Pleasant Hill Winery.

See also
 Texas wine

References

 
American Viticultural Areas
Geography of Texas
Texas wine
1998 establishments in Texas